Helen Sonia Cooper (born 1963 in London) is a British illustrator and an author of children's literature. She grew up in Cumbria, where she practiced literature and piano playing. She currently lives in Oxford.

Cooper has twice been awarded the Kate Greenaway Medal from the Chartered Institute of Library and Information Professionals (CILIP), recognising the year's best children's book illustration by a British subject. She won for The Boy Who Wouldn't Go To Bed in 1996, which she wrote and illustrated. In 1998 she won for Pumpkin Soup, which she also wrote and illustrated. They were consecutive projects for her.

Beside winning the two Greenaway Medals (no one has won three), Cooper made the shortlist for The Bear Under the Stairs (Doubleday, 1993) and Tatty Ratty (Doubleday, 2001).

As well as her solo picture books, Cooper writes and illustrates her own Middle Grade fiction. Most recently "The Hippo at the end of the Hall' published by David Fickling Books in the UK.

WorldCat reports that Pumpkin Soup is her work most widely held in participating libraries.

Works
Cooper is both the writer and the illustrator of many published picture books and a set of four "mini-books" about toy animals (1994), later packaged in English, Spanish, and Catalan languages as Toy Tales (1999).
She has illustrated a few books by other writers and written one book with another illustrator, as noted.
 Kit and the Magic Kite (1987)
 Lucy and the Eggwitch (1989), by Moira Miller
 Solomon's Secret (1989), by Saviour Pirotta
 Ella and the Rabbit (1990)
 Christmas Stories for the Very Young (1990), a collection edited by Sally Grindley
 The Owl and the Pussycat (1991), an edition of the classic by Edward Lear
 Chestnut Grey (1993)
 The Bear Under the Stairs (1993) 
 The House Cat (1993)
 Toy Tales (1994; 1999 omnibus under one title)
 The tale of bear
 The tale of frog
 The tale of duck
 The tale of pig
 Little Monster Did It! (1995)
 The Boy Who Wouldn't Go To Bed (1996)
 Pumpkin Soup (1998)
 Tatty Ratty (2001)
 Sandmare (Corgi, 2001), written by Cooper and illustrated by Ted Dewan
 A Pipkin of Pepper (2003 or 2004) – sequel to Pumpkin Soup
 Delicious (2006) – sequel to Pumpkin Soup
 Dog Biscuit (2008)
 The Hippo at the end of the Hall (2017) - a children's illustrated middle grade novel.
 Saving The Butterfly (2022) - Written by Cooper and illustrated by Gill Smith. 

References

External links
 

British children's writers
British children's book illustrators
Kate Greenaway Medal winners
Writers who illustrated their own writing
Writers from London
1963 births
Living people
Date of birth missing (living people)
British women illustrators